Świniary may refer to the following places in Poland:
Świniary, Góra County in Lower Silesian Voivodeship (south-west Poland)
Świniary, Oleśnica County in Lower Silesian Voivodeship (south-west Poland)
Świniary, Łódź Voivodeship (central Poland)
Świniary, Lesser Poland Voivodeship (south Poland)
Świniary, Świętokrzyskie Voivodeship (south-central Poland)
Świniary, Płock County in Masovian Voivodeship (east-central Poland)
Świniary, Przasnysz County in Masovian Voivodeship (east-central Poland)
Świniary, Siedlce County in Masovian Voivodeship (east-central Poland)
Świniary, Greater Poland Voivodeship (west-central Poland)
Świniary, Międzyrzecz County in Lubusz Voivodeship (west Poland)
Świniary, Słubice County in Lubusz Voivodeship (west Poland)
Świniary Nowe a village in Sandomierz County, Świętokrzyskie Voivodeship (south-central Poland)